RMS Adriatic was a British ocean liner of the White Star Line. The ship was the only one of the four which was never the world's largest ship. However, she was the largest, the fastest, and the most luxurious of the Big Four, being the first ocean liner to have an indoor swimming pool and a Turkish bath.

She began her career on the brand new route from Southampton to New York before joining, from 1911, her sister ships on the secondary route from Liverpool. They were in fact slow liners intended to provide a service at moderate prices. When World War I broke out, the Adriatic was among the ships that continued their civilian transatlantic service, while carrying many provisions. In 1917, she was requisitioned and served as a troop transport.

After the war, she was refitted several times, and was gradually used for cruises, which became her main services in the 1930s. When Cunard Line and White Star Line merged in 1934, she was quickly deemed unnecessary and sold at the end of the year. She was scrapped in Osaka in 1935.

Conception and construction

At the end of the 19th century, White Star Line, under the leadership of Thomas Henry Ismay, changed its policy to embark on the construction of ships which no longer sought to dominate in the area of speed, but to transport passengers en masse and regularly on spacious and comfortable liners. This resulted in the commissioning of the Big Four, four large, moderate-speed liners ordered at the start of the new century. The first, the Celtic, entered service in 1901, followed by the Cedric in 1903 and the Baltic in 1904. The fourth ship in the series, the Adriatic, was ordered from Harland and Wolff shipyards in Belfast in December 1903, but she wasn't completed until May 1907, a strangely long delay. This delay could be explained by the fact that the shipyards were building the Amerika at the same time, with a similar profile. Harland and Wolff built Adriatic on slipway number three of its North Yard in Belfast, Ireland.

To continue to own the largest ships in the world, White Star had asked the shipyards to enlarge the Baltic during its construction; the ship measured nearly 3,000 tons more than its predecessor, but it was in return slightly slower: its machines not having been modified. In the case of the Adriatic, it was decided to give her a size similar to the Baltic (her tonnage nevertheless surpassing that of the Baltic by a few hundred tons), but she was equipped significantly more powerful machines in order to allow her to maintain a better speed. Her name, in reference to the Adriatic Sea, was also given to her in reference to a previous liner of the same name which served the company for almost thirty years at the end of the previous century.

She was launched on 20 September 1906, the same day as the Cunard Line's . She was then completed in dry dock and delivered to her company on 25 April 1907, before sailing to Liverpool for her maiden voyage.

Early career

When the Adriatic entered service, she was celebrated by the White Star Line as "the largest ship in the world" (although the Kaiserin Auguste Victoria overtook her by only 40 tons), and the company organized a departure with great fanfare for her maiden voyage from Liverpool to New York on 8 May 1907, arriving in New York on 16 May 1907 with 2,502 passengers onboard (365 first class, 335 second class and 1,802 third class). The liner sails under the command of Captain Edward Smith, who transferred from the Baltic.

After her maiden voyage, she was transferred to the Southampton – New York route, arriving in Southampton to a very warm welcome on 30 May 1907, and inaugurating White Star's Southampton service on 5 June 1907. She was the first White Star liner to use Southampton's newly-built dock, named the White Star Dock. (In 1922 it was renamed the Ocean Dock.) This port, hitherto little frequented by British companies, was indeed chosen to serve as the base for the new express service desired by White Star, in view of the arrival of its Olympic-class liners. It also had the advantage of allowing a French stopover in Cherbourg. The Adriatic was thus assigned to this new service alongside the Oceanic, the Teutonic and the Majestic. At the same time, Liverpool becomes a secondary port of departure for services provided by the Baltic, the Cedric, the Celtic, and the Arabic. The Adriatic ran the Southampton route until 1911 when  replaced her. Adriatic then returned to the Liverpool route.

During this service, the Adriatic proved to be very popular with customers for her luxurious facilities (she was the first ocean liner to have Turkish baths and an indoor swimming pool) despite a lower service speed than her Southampton running mates. An incident occurred on 10 October 1908, when it was discovered that four crew members were stealing passenger luggage and concealing it in the ship for subsequent resale. Their booty is estimated at £4,000, a very significant sum for the time. Another incident occurred in November 1909, when the liner ran aground in the entrance to the Ambrose Channel on its way to New York, then in August 1910 when the liner's stokers mutinied in Southampton. On 26 June 1911, following the entry into service of the Olympic, the Adriatic made her last crossing from Southampton before joining her sister ships on the Liverpool route. She remained there until World War I, although she also made cruises between New York and the Mediterranean during the winter of 1911.

Adriatic sailed from Liverpool on 18 April 1912 and arrived in New York on 27 April 1912. Some of Titanics rescued passengers and crew returned to Britain aboard her, departing from New York on 2 May 1912. The passengers included disgraced White Star Line chairman J. Bruce Ismay and Millvina Dean, the disaster's youngest and last living survivor.

Alexander Agassiz died in 1910 while a passenger in Adriatic.

World War I
When World War I broke out, the Adriatic and the Baltic continued to provide regular service on the Liverpool route while other White Star liners were requisitioned. They were quickly joined by three ships of the Red Star Line, the Vaderland, the Zeeland and the Lapland. The Adriatic's large cargo hold enabled her to carry large quantities of provisions in wartime, but U.S. authorities, then neutral in the conflict, viewed the ship with suspicion, fearing she might make a secret stopover in Halifax to recover Canadian troops. From 12 April 1917 to 28 February 1919, the ship served under the Liner Requisition Scheme and carried troops and ammunition across the Atlantic after the entry by the United States into the war.

During the war, the bunkers of the Adriatic were often used to supply the Royal Navy with fuel. During this period, on 26 January 1918, while docked at Pier 60 in New York, she was the victim of a fire when barrels of oil stored on her deck caught fire. The firefighters managed to control the flames by flooding the bridge and throwing the burnt barrels into the sea. When the war was over, the liner was fully refurbished, and her facilities were modified to carry fewer passengers.

Later career and demise

The Adriatic returned to service on 3 September 1919, departing from Southampton and accompanied by the Lapland, to ensure provisional service pending the return of requisitioned ships and the arrival of new liners. From 1920, the Lapland was replaced by the Olympic. She was finally withdrawn after a last crossing, on 14 December 1921, in view of the arrival of the Majestic and the Homeric. After an overhaul in Belfast, she joined the Celtic, the Cedric and the Baltic on the Liverpool route on 13 May 1922.

On a westbound voyage at 01:30 on 10 August 1922 near Cobh, the Adriatic suffered a gas explosion in her number three hold, which she was using as a reserve coal bunker. The explosion killed five crewmen, severely injured another three, tore the hatch off the hold, broke and twisted girders and beams and started a coal fire. Some of the dead and injured were stokers who had gone into the hold to work coal for her furnaces. One was an electrician, Leslie Ablett, who was rigging a cluster of electric lights by which the stokers were to work. Three were stokers who had been sleeping in the open on the hatch cover because it was a hot summer night. One of the stokers sleeping on the hatch cover was blown overboard Two liners, CGT's Lafayette and United States Lines' Reliance, changed course to come to Adriatics assistance. Adriatics crew fought and extinguished the fire. Her Second Engineer, James Corrigan, entered the burning hold and rescued two injured men. At 03:55 Adriatics wireless operator signalled that there was no further danger, so Lafayette and Reliance resumed their normal courses. The injured were treated in the ship's sick bay. Two of the ship's stewardesses were trained nurses and helped to tend the injured and dying. All of the dead and injured were from Liverpool. Before Adriatic reached New York, her passengers raised $7,000 to help their families. Adriatic reached New York on 13 August. Marine insurance agents came aboard and assessed the damage at less than $1,000. Temporary repairs were made before she began her return voyage to Liverpool on 19 August.

From 1923 onwards, the Big Four made regular stops in Boston before arriving in New York. In 1925, the Adriatic was chartered by Welsh people living in the United States who wanted to go to the Eisteddfod Genedlaethol. The same year and despite her being eighteen years of age, she broke her speed record by crossing between New York and Liverpool in 7 days and 6 minutes. At the same time, with less transatlantic traffic, the Adriatic was increasingly used for cruises. In 1928, when she returned from the Mediterranean, she was reconverted again, this time to become a "cabin class" ship offering more affordable rates. Making her first crossing in this capacity on 28 April 1928; she quickly met with great success in this area.

In 1929, cruises no longer managed to be profitable enough. The Adriatic was put to rest in Liverpool throughout the winter as the economic crisis erupted. She was now only used during the summer. The arrival of the Britannic and the Georgic further contributed to rendering the Adriatic useless. She served as an experimental ground for a very low-cost weekend cruise in the summer of 1931, but the operation was inconclusive and her September cruises were cancelled. In 1932, the Cedric was scrapped. She was followed the following year by the Baltic. Nevertheless, the company decided to keep the Adriatic as a reserve ship, as the British economy seemed to recover little by little. The following summers were not more prolific and the liner only made a few cruises off the Iberian Peninsula and occasional crossings of the Atlantic.

In 1934, Adriatics code letters HKNW were superseded by the call sign GLSJ.

On 24 February 1934, the Adriatic made her last transatlantic crossing. After 's successful 1933 "Peace Cruise" in the Baltic, in 1934, the British Boy Scouts and Girl Guides chartered her for a similar cruise with Robert Baden-Powell on board in the Mediterranean, under the command of Commander CP Freeman, RD. Adriatic sailed from Liverpool on 29 March 1934, and called at Gibraltar, Villefranche-sur-Mer, Malta, Algiers, and Lisbon. During that spring, White Star Line merged with its rival Cunard Line forming Cunard-White Star Line. The Adriatic became part of the new fleet, but was clearly superfluous given her age. After a final voyage in September, she was immobilised, and sold in November to Japanese wreckers for £48,000. She left Liverpool for the last time on 19 December 1934, her longest voyage ever; to be scrapped at Osaka, Japan, in 1935.

Characteristics

Being the last of the Big Four, the Adriatic displayed similar dimensions to the Baltic with a 222.2 m length, 23 m width and 16 m draft. She was slightly bulkier than her predecessor, with 24,541 gross tonnage, making her one of the largest liners in the world when she entered service (the Kaiserin Auguste Victoria only exceeding her by 30 tons). However, her appearance remained the same as with her three sister ships. The Adriatic therefore had a black hull with a red base, all topped by a white superstructure. Her funnels were buff-colored crowned with black cuff, and the ship had four masts intended to serve as support for the lookout's nest, as well as for the cables of the wireless telegraphy. She had four continuous decks, as well as an upper deck and several superstructures. In the 1920s, she distinguished herself from her sister ships by having the front part of her promenade deck fitted with windows.

Like the other ships in the series, the Adriatic was propelled by two propellers operated by quadruple-expansion steam engines. Between them the two engines were rated at 1,720 NHP.  of her cargo holds were refrigerated.
However, in view of her higher tonnage, the White Star had her fitted with more powerful machines, capable reaching an average speed of 17 knots, higher than that of her sister ships but still significantly lower than the fastest liners on the route. Normally, she consumed 260 tonnes of coal per day.

The Adriatic stood out from her sister ships for the luxury of her facilities. In addition to the sumptuous dining room topped with a glass roof, the smoking room adorned with stained glass, the veranda café and the lounges she shared with its sister ships, she was the first to be equipped with Turkish baths, as well as an indoor swimming pool. At the start of her career, the Adriatic could carry 425 first-class, 500 second-class, and 2,000 third-class passengers (all accompanied by 560 crew members). From 1919, she was redesigned to carry only 400 first-class, 465 second-class and 1300 third-class passengers. Finally, from 1928, her capacities were transformed to carry 506 cabin-class passengers, 560 tourist-class, and 404 third-class.

See also
 List of White Star Line ships

References

Bibliography

External links

 – postcards of Adriatic

 – video

1906 ships
Maritime incidents in 1922
Ocean liners of the United Kingdom
Ships built in Belfast
Ships built by Harland and Wolff
Ships of the White Star Line
Steamships of the United Kingdom
World War I passenger ships of the United Kingdom